The Aeros Style is a Ukrainian single-place paraglider designed and produced by Aeros of Kyiv.

Design and development
The Style was intended as an intermediate paraglider for local and cross country flying. Some sizes were AFNOR certified as "standard". The original Style design was in production in 2003, but is no longer available, having been replaced by the Style 2. The Style 2 is an entirely new design, which shares only the name of the previous aircraft. The early Style variant number indicates the wing area in square metres. The Style 2 uses simple size designations instead of wing areas for model numbers.

The Style 2 is constructed from Gelvenor OLKS fabric for the wing's top surface and NCV Porcher 9017E38 for the bottom surface, with the ribs made from NCV Porcher 9017E29. The lines are made from Cousin Trestec.

Variants
Style 26
Style 28
AFNOR certified.
Style 30
AFNOR certified.
Style 32
AFNOR certified.
Style 2 XXS
Style 2 XS
Style 2 S
Style 2 M
AFNOR certified.
Style 2 L
AFNOR certified.
Style 2 XL
Style 2 XXL

Specifications (Style 2 M)

References

External links

Official website

Paragliders
Style